"Big Shiny Tunes 2" is the second edition of the MuchMusic compilation series,  Big Shiny Tunes. The album had been accompanied by heavy advertising in Canada. It is the best-selling album of the series, having sold 1,233,000 copies.

Commercial performance
Big Shiny Tunes 2 debuted at #1 on the Canadian Albums Chart, with 128,000 units sold in its first week. By March 1998, the album was certified Diamond by the CRIA for sales of 1 million units.

Big Shiny Tunes 2 went on to sell 1,233,000 copies before going out of print. Despite being out of print, Big Shiny Tunes 2 is still the fourth best-selling album ever in Canada of the Nielsen SoundScan era as of 2020.

Track listing
 The Prodigy - "Breathe (Edit)"
 Blur - "Song 2"
 Third Eye Blind - "Semi-Charmed Life"
 Smash Mouth - "Walkin' on the Sun"
 Sugar Ray - "Fly" (featuring Super Cat)
 Bran Van 3000 - "Drinking in L.A."
 Marilyn Manson - "The Beautiful People"
 Holly McNarland - "Numb"
 Bush - "Swallowed"
 Matchbox 20 - "Push"
 Collective Soul - "Precious Declaration (Remix)"
 The Tea Party - "Temptation (Edit) (Tom Lord-Alge Mix)"
 The Chemical Brothers - "Block Rockin' Beats (Radio Edit)"
 Wide Mouth Mason - "My Old Self"
 Radiohead - "Paranoid Android"
 The Age of Electric - "Remote Control"
 Stone Temple Pilots - "Lady Picture Show"

See also 
 List of diamond-certified albums in Canada

References 

1997 compilation albums